Hatia is a suburb neighborhood of Ranchi, Jharkhand, India.
Hatia railway station is the railway station serving the capital city of Ranchi in the Ranchi district in the Indian state of Jharkhand.

Etymology
The name "Hatia" derive from "Hat" which means "market." The Hat was established by King of Barkagarh Ani Nath Shahdeo.

Geography

Location           

It is adjacent to Ranchi, the capital of Jharkhand. Hatia developed as a suburb of Ranchi. Away from the rush in the main city, this part of Ranchi is comparatively quiet and calm. With HEC developing a huge infrastructural set up in the area, Hatia is one of the largest and most well-maintained dwelling destinations in Ranchi.

Area overview
The map alongside shows a part of the Ranchi plateau, most of it at an average elevation of 2,140 feet above sea level. Only a small part in the north-eastern part of the district is the lower Ranchi plateau, spread over Silli, Rahe, Sonahatu and Tamar CD blocks, at an elevation of 500 to 1,000 feet above sea level. There is a 16 km long ridge south-west of Ranchi. There are isolated hills in the central plateau. The principal river of the district, the Subarnarekha, originates near Ratu, flows in an easterly direction and descends from the plateau, with a drop of about 300 feet at Hundru Falls. Subarnarekha and other important rivers are marked on the map. The forested area is shaded in the map. A major part of the North Karanpura Area and some fringe areas of the Piparwar Area of the Central Coalfields Limited, both located in the North Karanpura Coalfield, are in Ranchi district. There has been extensive industrial activity in Ranchi district, since independence. Ranchi district is first in the state in terms of population. 8.83% of the total population of the state lives in this district - 56.9% is rural population and 43.1% is urban population.</ref>.

Note: The map alongside presents some of the notable locations in the district. All places marked in the map are linked in the larger full screen map.

Economy
Heavy Engineering Corporation, one of the largest engineering companies in India, is situated in Hatia, Ranchi, Jharkhand.

Transport
Hatia railway station, station code HTE, is the railway station serving the capital city of Ranchi in the Ranchi district in the Indian state of Jharkhand. It serves as the terminal station of several trains, and many trains pass through it.

Education
One of the premier technical institutions, National Institute of Advanced Manufacturing Technology is situated in Hatia, Ranchi, Jharkhand.

References

External links
Official website of NIFFT
HEC, Ranchi

Cities and towns in Ranchi district
Geography of Jharkhand